Pannexin 1 is a protein in humans that is encoded by the PANX1 gene.

The protein encoded by this gene belongs to the innexin family. Innexin family members are the structural components of gap junctions. This protein and pannexin 2 are abundantly expressed in central nerve system (CNS) and are coexpressed in various neuronal populations. Studies in Xenopus oocytes suggest that this protein alone and in combination with pannexin 2 may form cell type-specific gap junctions with distinct properties.

Clinical relevance 
Truncating mutations in this gene have been shown to promote breast cancer metastasis to the lungs by allowing cancer cells to survive mechanical stretch in the microcirculation.

Disruptions of this gene have been associated to melanoma tumor progression.

Pannexin 1 is also an important component of membrane channels involved in the formation of thin plasma membrane extensions called apoptopodia and beaded apoptopodia during apoptosis.

References

Further reading